Ryan Matterson (born 13 October 1994) is an Australian professional rugby league footballer who plays as a er or  forward for the Parramatta Eels in the NRL.

He started his career as a  before moving permanently to the back row when he joined the Wests Tigers.

He previously played for the Sydney Roosters, with whom he won the 2018 NRL Grand Final and the Wests Tigers in the National Rugby League. Matterson has also played for the City Origin side and New South Wales.

Background
Matterson was born in Greenacre, New South Wales, Australia, and was educated at St Pauls Catholic College, Greystanes, graduating in 2012. He is the nephew of former Sydney Roosters and Brisbane Broncos player Terry Matterson.

Matterson played his junior rugby league for the Wentworthville Magpies and Bankstown Bulls, before being signed by the Parramatta Eels.

Playing career

Early career
From 2012 to 2014, Matterson played for the Parramatta Eels' NYC team. In 2014, he captained the side. 

On 3 May 2014, he played for the New South Wales under-20s team against the Queensland under-20s team. On 26 June 2014, he re-signed with the Eels on a 3-year contract. On 18 October 2014, he played for the Junior Kangaroos against the Junior Kiwis. In 2015, he graduated to Eels' New South Wales Cup team, Wentworthville Magpies. In August 2015, he signed a 2-year contract with the Sydney Roosters starting in 2016.

2016
In Round 8 of the 2016 NRL season, Matterson made his NRL debut for the Roosters against the St. George Illawarra Dragons, scoring a try. On 8 May, he played for NSW City against NSW Country, after just two NRL appearances, playing at centre and taking an intercept to set up a try, before scoring one himself in the second half of City's 44-30 victory.

2017
Matterson made 23 appearances for the Roosters in 2017 as the club fell short of a grand final appearance losing to North Queensland in the preliminary final 29-16.

2018
In 2018, Matterson was part of the Roosters which won their 4th minor premiership in 6 years.  On 30 September, Matterson played in Easts 21-6 victory over Melbourne in the 2018 NRL grand final.  This would be the final appearance for Matterson as an Eastern Suburbs player as he had signed a three year deal to join the Wests Tigers starting in 2019.

2019
Matterson made his debut for the Wests Tigers in round 1 of the 2019 NRL season against Manly-Warringah at Leichhardt Oval.

Matterson scored his first try for the club in round 4 against Penrith which the Wests Tigers lost 9-8.

Matterson made a total of 24 appearances for the club in the 2019 NRL season as they finished ninth and missed out on the finals.  On September 19, Matterson was granted leave from training for the final part of the year due to personal reasons.

Having been granted a release from the Wests Tigers on October 31, Matterson then signed a three-year deal with the Parramatta Eels, his junior club, on November 7.

2020
On 3 February, Matterson spoke to the media for the first time since joining Parramatta and apologised publicly to supporters of the Wests Tigers club saying "To all the fans out there I'm sorry for how it happened, I do say sorry to them and I understand their frustrations but it was kind of out of my control, "I don't sign contracts to purposefully want to leave. Something did happen at the Tigers, and I'm sorry that happened so with the intention of signing with Parramatta, I do want to stay here permanently and long-term and really enjoy my football.  I was frustrated when it was perceived [to be] about money. It wasn't. That just wasn't the case".

Matterson made his debut for Parramatta in round 1 of the 2020 NRL season against arch rivals Canterbury-Bankstown.  Parramatta would go on to win the match 8-2.

In round 5, Matterson scored the winning try for Parramatta as the club defeated Penrith 16-10.  The result saw Parramatta win their first five games of the year which was their best start to a season since 1986.

In round 11, Matterson faced his former club Wests Tigers for the first time since departing them under bitter circumstances. Early in the first half, he was taken from the field with concussion after being knocked out attempting a tackle on Wests player Russell Packer. Matterson took no further part in the match as Parramatta won 26-16.

At the end of the 2020 regular season, Parramatta finished in third place and qualified for the finals. Matterson played in both finals matches where the club lost to Melbourne and South Sydney.

2021
In round 2 against Melbourne, Matterson was taken from the field with concussion after being elbowed in the head by Melbourne player Felise Kaufusi.  As a result, Matterson missed the following five matches.

In round 12 against South Sydney, Matterson was sent to the sin bin for a high tackle during Parramatta's 38-20 loss.

In round 22 against Manly, Matterson was sent off for high contact to the head of Brad Parker during Parramatta's 56-10 loss.
On 16 August, Matterson was suspended for three matches in relation to the tackle.
Matterson missed the first week of the finals due to his suspension but returned for Parramatta's semi-final against Penrith which Parramatta lost 8-6 ending their season.

2022
In round 9 of the 2022 NRL season, Matterson scored the winning try for Parramatta in their 22-20 victory over Penrith at Penrith Park.  It was Penrith's first loss of the season and also the first time the club had lost at the ground since 2019.
On 29 May, Matterson was selected by New South Wales to play in game one of the 2022 State of Origin series.
On 18 June, it was announced that Matterson had signed a four-year contract extension to remain at Parramatta until the end of 2026.  The following day, Matterson was left out of the New South Wales squad for game two against Queensland.
Matterson played 23 games for Parramatta in 2022 including their Grand Final loss to Penrith at Stadium Australia.

On 5 October, Matterson elected to serve a three-game suspension for a crusher tackle on Penrith player Dylan Edwards rather than pay a $4,000 fine.  Matterson explained his reasons behind taking the ban saying “I just feel that $4,000 is pretty hefty considering I have already paid close to $4,000 in fines this year for things that are absurd,” Matterson said, At the end of the day I have personal things I need to worry about outside of rugby league. I just didn’t think it was warranted. If you do something wrong at work. They don’t take money off you. It’s always hard. I love playing. It’s something I spoke to the club about before I made the decision. Obviously it’s a hard one, but I have personal reasons I need to take into consideration".  Matterson then explained his frustration at Penrith's Jarome Luai avoiding sanctions after he kicked Parramatta player Isaiah Papali'i saying “Considering Jarome Luai is kicking players and he didn’t get cited. It makes you think ‘Where is this game heading?".

References

External links

Parramatta Eels profile
Wests Tigers profile
Sydney Roosters profile
Roosters profile

1994 births
Living people
New South Wales City Origin rugby league team players
Sydney Roosters players
Parramatta Eels players
New South Wales Rugby League State of Origin players
Junior Kangaroos players
Rugby league second-rows
Rugby league five-eighths
Rugby league centres
Rugby league players from Sydney
Wentworthville Magpies players
Wests Tigers players